Breindele Cossack (Yiddish: Breindele Kozak) is a darkly comic 1887 Yiddish-language play by Abraham Goldfaden,  generally accounted one of the best of his early works. The title character is a woman who, at the start of the play, has already driven five husbands to suicide. The play is centered on her and her sixth husband, Guberman, who marries her fully aware of her history and believing he will be different; however, she ultimately drives him to suicide as well.

References

 Adler, Jacob, A Life on the Stage: A Memoir, translated and with commentary by Lulla Rosenfeld, Knopf, New York, 1999, 102.

1887 plays
Yiddish plays